The Central District of Babolsar County is a district (bakhsh) in Babolsar County, Mazandaran Province, Iran. At the 2006 census, its population was 67,211, in 18,650 families.  The District has one city: Babolsar. The District has two rural districts (dehestan): Babolrud Rural District and Saheli Rural District.

References 

Babolsar County
Districts of Mazandaran Province